František Ševčík (January 11, 1942 – July 22, 2017) was an ice hockey player who played for the Czechoslovak national team. He won a silver medal at the 1968 Winter Olympics.

References

External links
 
 

1942 births
2017 deaths
People from Blansko District
Czechoslovak ice hockey right wingers
Ice hockey players at the 1968 Winter Olympics
LHK Jestřábi Prostějov players
HC Kometa Brno players
Medalists at the 1968 Winter Olympics
Olympic ice hockey players of Czechoslovakia
Olympic medalists in ice hockey
Olympic silver medalists for Czechoslovakia
Czech ice hockey right wingers
Sportspeople from the South Moravian Region